The Delaware United States Senate special election for 1802 was held on January 14, 1802. Senator Henry Latimer had resigned after becoming unhappy over the tactics of his political opponents who were still bitter over the circumstances of the contested election in 1792. Samuel White defeated Archibald Alexander, who had previously failed to win gubernatorial and House elections, by 10 votes.

Results

References

Delaware
1802
1802 Delaware elections
United States Senate 1802
Special elections to the 7th United States Congress
Delaware 1802